The Roman Catholic Diocese of Chikwawa is a diocese located in the city of Chikwawa in the Ecclesiastical province of Blantyre in Malawi.

History
 March 22, 1965: Established as Diocese of Chikwawa from the Metropolitan Archdiocese of Blantyre

Bishops
 Bishops of Chikwawa (Roman rite)
 Bishop Eugen Joseph Frans Vroemen, S.M.M. (1965.03.22 – 1979.02.12)
 Bishop Felix Eugenio Mkhori (1979.02.12 – 2001.01.23), appointed Bishop of Lilongwe
 Bishop Peter Martin Musikuwa (since 2003.04.16)

Auxiliary Bishop
Felix Eugenio Mkhori (1977-1979), appointed Bishop here

See also
Roman Catholicism in Malawi

Sources
 GCatholic.org
 Catholic Hierarchy

Roman Catholic dioceses in Malawi
Christian organizations established in 1965
Roman Catholic dioceses and prelatures established in the 20th century
Roman Catholic Ecclesiastical Province of Blantyre